Kirkibost is a low-lying island west of North Uist in the Outer Hebrides of Scotland.

Geography
Kirkibost, along with neighbouring Baleshare, is covered by a machair system of coastal plains covered with shell sand, part covered by grass, with some sand dunes, fens and peat.  Together with Baleshare, it forms part of a Site of Special Scientific Interest.  The small islands of Eilean Mòr, Bior-eilean and Sròmaigh lie between Kirkibost and North Uist.

Wildlife
The island is important for corncrakes, various wading birds and overwintering wildfowl.

Economy
Kirkibost has been cultivated in the past, but is now used only for seasonal cattle grazing.

References

Uist islands